G.F.E. 105 is an association football club based in Eldoret, Kenya. The club was formerly known as F.C 105 before the Management (Joshua and Ray) teamed up with global field evangelism under Bishop Ben Bahati hence the name G.F.E 105.  The club currently competes in the Kenyan National Super League, and plays its home games at Kipchoge stadium.

GFE 105 won the Sakata Ball in 2011 managed by Ray Odhiambo and Head coach Joshua Obara Abache.

References

External links

Kenyan National Super League clubs
FKF Division One clubs
Football clubs in Kenya